The Progressive Democratic Party of the North was a political party in Luxembourg.

History
The party was established by liberals in the north of Luxembourg and was linked to the Radical Socialist Party. It was led by former National Independent Party MP Nicholas Mathieu.

In the 1931 elections it received 5.3% of the vote, winning a single seat. It did not contest the partial elections of 1934, as its seat was not up for election. By the 1937 elections Mathieu was head of a new party, the Liberal Party.

References

Liberal parties in Luxembourg
Defunct liberal political parties
Defunct political parties in Luxembourg
Radical parties